Tiedong District is a district of Siping City, Jilin, China.

It is the main business area in Siping City.

Administrative divisions

Subdistricts:
Jiefang Subdistrict, Beishichang Subdistrict, Sima Road Subdistrict, Qima Road Subdistrict, Beimen Subdistrict, Huangtukang Subdistrict, Pingdong Subdistrict

Towns:
Shanmen, Yehe Manchu Ethnic Town

Townships: 
Changfa Township, Chengdong Township

References

External links

County-level divisions of Jilin